The 2012–13 Barako Bull Energy Cola was the 11th season of the franchise in the Philippine Basketball Association (PBA).

Key dates
August 19: The 2012 PBA Draft took place in Robinson's Midtown Mall, Manila.
September 5: Energy Food & Drinks, Inc., owners of the Barako Bull Energy franchise announced that they will rename their team as the Barako Bull Energy Cola starting this season.
November 14: Bong Ramos replaces Junel Baculi as the head coach for the Barako Bull Energy Cola

Draft picks

Roster

Philippine Cup

Eliminations

Standings

Game log

|- bgcolor="#bbffbb" 
| 1
|  October 3
|  Air21
|  90–87
|  Tubid (19)
|  Villanueva (14)
|  Anthony (5)
|  Smart Araneta Coliseum
|  1–0
|  Boxscores
|- bgcolor="#edbebf" 
| 2
|  October 10
|  Petron Blaze
|  89–98
|  Urbiztondo (17)
|  Kramer, Anthony (10)
|  Josh Urbiztondo (7)
|  Smart Araneta Coliseum
|  1–1
|  Boxscores
|- bgcolor="#edbebf" 
| 3
|  October 14
|  Alaska
|  86–102
|  Villanueva (22)
|  Villanueva (17)
|  Urbiztondo (5)
|  Smart Araneta Coliseum
|  1–2
|  Boxscores
|- bgcolor="#bbffbb" 
| 4
|  October 19
|  Barangay Ginebra
|  92–82
|  Anthony (21)
|  Villanueva (8)
|  Urbiztondo, Villanueva (4)
|  Smart Araneta Coliseum
|  2–2
|  Boxscores
|- bgcolor="#edbebf" 
| 5
|  October 24
|  Talk 'N Text
|  76–79
|  Villanueva (16)
|  Villanueva, Kramer (7)
|  Najorda, Urbiztondo (5)
|  Smart Araneta Coliseum
|  2–3
|  Boxscores
|- bgcolor="#edbebf" 
| 6
|  October 28
|  San Mig Coffee
|  91–92
|  Tubid (17)
|  Pennisi (9)
|  Urbiztondo (8)
|  Smart Araneta Coliseum
|  2–4
|  Boxscores
|- bgcolor="#edbebf" 
| 7
|  October 31
|  Meralco
|  86–99
|  Kramer, Urbiztondo (14)
|  Villanueva (11)
|  Tubid (4)
|  Smart Araneta Coliseum
|  2–5
|  Boxscores

|- bgcolor="#bbffbb" 
| 8
|  November 4
|  GlobalPort
|  95–94
|  Tubid (19)
|  Anthony (13)
|  Urbiztondo (5)
|  Smart Araneta Coliseum
|  3–5
|  Boxscore
|- bgcolor="#edbebf" 
| 9
|  November 9
|  Air21
|  85–86
|  Tubid (24)
|  Anthony (12)
|  Urbiztondo, Anthony, Villanueva (4)
|  Cuneta Astrodome
|  3–6
|  Boxscore
|- bgcolor="#edbebf" 
| 10
|  November 16
|  San Mig Coffee
|  73–93
|  Tubid (17)
|  Ballesteros (9)
|  Yap (4)
|  Ynares Center
|  3–7
|  Boxscore
|- bgcolor="#edbebf"
| 11
|  November 24
|  Petron Blaze
|  83–93
|  Seigle (16)
|  Kramer (21)
|  Urbiztondo (4)
|  Lucena City
|  3–8
|  Boxscore
|- bgcolor="#edbebf"
| 12
|  November 30
|  Meralco
|  73–85
|  Tubid (20)
|  Kramer (18)
|  Cruz (4)
|  Smart Araneta Coliseum
|  3–9
|  Boxscore

|- bgcolor="#bbffbb" 
| 13
|  December 2
|  Barangay Ginebra
|  83–79
|  Tubid (18) 
|  Kramer (22)
|  Yap (5)
|  Smart Araneta Coliseum
|  4–9
|  Boxscore
|- bgcolor="#edbebf"
| 14
|  December 7
|  Rain or Shine
|  101–116
|  Seigle (21)
|  Kramer (13)
|  Anthony (5)
|  Mall of Asia Arena
|  4–10
|  Boxscore

Commissioner's Cup

Eliminations

Standings

Game log

|- bgcolor="#bbffbb" 
| 1
|  February 8
|  San Mig Coffee
|  79–75
|  Brock (18)
|  Brock (12)
|  J. Villanueva (5)
|  Smart Araneta Coliseum
|  1–0
|  boxscore
|- bgcolor="#bbffbb" 
| 2
|  February 10
|  GlobalPort
|  98–88 (OT)
|  Brock (25)
|  Brock (18)
|  J. Villanueva (6)
|  Smart Araneta Coliseum
|  2–0
|  boxscore
|- bgcolor="#edbebf" 
| 3
|  February 17
|  Alaska
|  73–77
|  Urbiztondo (15)
|  Brock (15)
|  J. Villanueva (4)
|  Smart Araneta Coliseum
|  2–1
|  boxscore
|- bgcolor="#bbffbb" 
| 4
|  February 22
|  Air21
|  91–86
|  Brock (23)
|  Brock (15)
|  Urbiztondo (5)
|  Mall of Asia Arena
|  3–1
|  boxscore
|- bgcolor="#edbebf" 
| 5
|  February 27
|  Barangay Ginebra
|  72–93
|  Brock, Urbiztondo (16)
|  Brock (14)
|  Urbiztondo (6)
|  Smart Araneta Coliseum
|  3–2
|  boxscore

|- bgcolor="#edbebf" 
| 6
|  March 3
|  Petron Blaze
|  78–91
|  Brock (20)
|  Brock (24)
|  J. Villanueva (5)
|  Smart Araneta Coliseum
|  3–3
|  boxscore
|- bgcolor="#edbebf" 
| 7
|  March 9
|  Talk 'N Text
|  98–101
|  Pennisi (19)
|  Brock (12)
|  Urbiztondo (7)
|  Legaspi City, Albay
|  3–4
|  boxscore
|- 
| 8
|  March 13
|  Meralco
|  
|  
|  
|  
|  Smart Araneta Coliseum
|  
|  
|- 
| 9
|  March 20
|  Rain or Shine
|  
|  
|  
|  
|  Smart Araneta Coliseum
|  
|  
|- 
| 10
|  March 24
|  Barangay Ginebra
|  
|  
|  
|  
|  Smart Araneta Coliseum
|  
|  
|- 
| 11
|  March 31
|  San Mig Coffee
|  
|  
|  
|  
|  Mall of Asia Arena
|  
|  

|- 
| 12
|  April 7
|  Petron Blaze
|  
|  
|  
|  
|  Smart Araneta Coliseum
|  
|  
|- 
| 13
|  April 12
|  Rain or Shine
|  
|  
|  
|  
|  Smart Araneta Coliseum
|  
|  
|- 
| 14
|  April 14
|  GlobalPort
|  
|  
|  
|  
|  Mall of Asia Arena
|  
|

Governors' Cup

Eliminations

Standings

Game log

Transactions

Trades

Pre-season

Commissioner's Cup

Governors' Cup

Recruited imports

References

Barako Bull Energy seasons
Barako Bull